KPVS and KLUA are commercial radio stations in the island of Hawaiʻi, broadcasting to the Hilo and Kailua-Kona areas on 95.9 MHz FM and 93.9 MHz FM, respectively. The two stations simulcast as The Beat, a rhythmic CHR format.

On April 1, 2016, the simulcast adopted its present format, at the time retaining the "Native FM" name.

References

External links

PVS
Hawaiian-music formatted radio stations
Radio stations established in 1991
1991 establishments in Hawaii
Rhythmic contemporary radio stations in the United States